Shuangfengqiao Station is a station on Line 3 of Chongqing Rail Transit in Chongqing municipality, China. It is located in Yubei District and opened in 2016. Due to the fact that this station was built with Shuangfengqiao Public Transport Hub, the exterior of this station varies from other elevated stations of Line 3.

Station structure

References

Railway stations in Chongqing
Railway stations in China opened in 2016
Chongqing Rail Transit stations